Baeacris is a genus of spur-throated grasshoppers in the family Acrididae. There are about nine described species in Baeacris, found in Central and South America.

Species
These nine species belong to the genus Baeacris:
 Baeacris bogotensis (Carbonell & Ronderos, 1973)  (Colombia, Ecuador)
 Baeacris descampsi (Carbonell & Ronderos, 1973)  (Colombia)
 Baeacris maquiritare (Carbonell & Ronderos, 1973)  (South America)
 Baeacris morosa (Rehn, 1905)  (Costa Rica)
 Baeacris peniana (Ronderos, 1992)  (Bolivia)
 Baeacris pseudopunctulata (Ronderos, 1964)  (Central and South America)
 Baeacris punctulata (Thunberg, 1824)  (South America)
 Baeacris talamancensis Rowell & Carbonell, 1977  (Costa Rica)
 Baeacris tarijensis (Ronderos, 1979)  (Costa Rica)

References

External links

 

Acrididae